Halae Araphenides or Halai Araphenides was a deme of ancient Attica, situated on its eastern coast between Brauron and Araphen, and was the harbour of Brauron, whence persons crossed over to Marmarium in Euboea.

Etymology
The deme draws the first part of its name from the saltiness along the coast, while the second part was introduced to distinguish it from the deme of Halae Aexonides.

History
Halae was mentioned by Euripides as close to the chain of Karystia. In this place was conserved a statue of Artemis Tauria brought from Tauris by Iphigenia and Orestes.

In the deme, expiatory rites were held which consisted of withdrawing drops of blood from the throat of a man by means of a knife; furthermore, they had midnight feasts and Pyrrhic dances.

Its port was also used by citizens of a Brauron and for the marble quarries of Karystos, near the island of Euboea, being the closest port of Attica.

Location
The site of Halae Araphenides is located near modern Artemida, Attica (formerly, Loutsa).

Notes

Bibliography
Primary sources
  (here)

Secondary sources

External links
 Halai Araphenides

Populated places in ancient Attica
Former populated places in Greece
Demoi